Ilmir Ilnurovich Nurisov (born 5 August 1996) is a Russian football player.

Club career
He made his debut for the main squad of FC Kuban Krasnodar on 23 September 2015 in a Russian Cup game against FC Shinnik Yaroslavl and scored his team's first goal as it won 2–1. He made his Russian Football National League for FC Kuban Krasnodar on 8 October 2016 against FC Dynamo Moscow.

International
He participated in the 2013 FIFA U-17 World Cup with the Russia national under-17 football team and in the 2015 UEFA European Under-19 Championship with Russia national under-19 football team, the Russia came in second in the latter.

References

External links
 
 
 

1996 births
People from Naberezhnye Chelny
Sportspeople from Tatarstan
Living people
Russian footballers
Russia youth international footballers
Association football midfielders
FC Kuban Krasnodar players
FC Urozhay Krasnodar players
FC Vitebsk players
FC Neftekhimik Nizhnekamsk players
Russian First League players
Russian Second League players
Belarusian Premier League players
Russian expatriate footballers
Expatriate footballers in Belarus
Russian expatriate sportspeople in Belarus